Trithemis aenea, the bronze dropwing,  is a species of dragonfly in the family Libellulidae. It is found in Western and Central Africa.

References

aenea
Insects described in 1961